Snow is a free-to-play winter sports video game developed by Poppermost Productions and was released for Microsoft Windows, and PlayStation 4. The 0.9 Beta was released on December 13, 2016.

Gameplay 

Snow is an open world skiing and snowboarding game that allows players to explore mountainous environments consisting of a range of different routes and discoverable items. This environment can be edited by players, with features such as jumps and rails able to be added dynamically anywhere throughout the area.

Characters can be customized by means of catalogues of popular winter sports clothing brands for players looking for a more sophisticated look. Players can compete individually or against their friends in various sporting events and competitions. Different spawn points on the maps can be chosen, allowing for different skiing and snowboarding styles.

Development 
The game was developed by Swedish video game developer Poppermost Productions. At the time the studio consisted of a small three person team. which would eventually grow as the project developed. Most of the designers were avid fan of Skiing or Snowboarding. During this time period extreme sports were no longer a popular video game genre, and the team set out to make a new one. However  the team also found that previous games in the genre failed to "truly captured the identity of the sports". In particular Poppermost's CEO had noted that previous games usually focused on a small number of athletes or sponsors, forced the players down a predetermined campaign as well as lacking "authenticity" 

The game primarily is centered around the fictional Sialia Mountain. The team opted to not base the setting on a real life mountain due to a desire to "ensure that every face was hand crafted towards gameplay" while also avoiding having to make compromises. This also allowed the team to include elements which would not  normally appear on such a mountain.

From the start the team opted to release the game via a Games-as-a service model, by which they would continually provide updated content. The team thus opted to make the game free to play in order to "remain relevant". Part of the reason the developer decided to release the game on the PS4 as opposed to the Xbox One was that Sony had a dedicated "free to play" development team.

The sound used in Snow was recorded on Kläppen, Sweden using microphones on rails and skis worn by a professional skier.

The game was released on Steam as an Early Access game on the October 10, 2013. An open beta for Playstation 4 was released on October 26, 2016. Despite its Free to Play nature, Poppermost Productions chose to initially sell both versions of the game during these betas in order to "limit the userbase" 

Snow uses the game backend service LootLocker to manage its microtransactions and in-game content.

In February 2019, Snow left Early Access with the release of Version 1.0. The game also was published by Crytek and co-developed by Wasted Studios.

References

External links 
 

2019 video games
CryEngine games
Free-to-play video games
Multiplayer and single-player video games
Open-world video games
MacOS games
PlayStation 4 games
PlayStation VR games
Skiing video games
Snowboarding video games
Video games developed in Sweden
Windows games
Early access video games